Pumpkintown is an unincorporated community in Pickens County, South Carolina, on State Highway 8 northwest of Greenville.

History 
The community was settled before 1791, and was originally called "Pumpkin Town", named by an anonymous early traveler who was impressed at seeing the nearby Oolenoy River valley covered with large yellow pumpkins.

References 

Unincorporated communities in Pickens County, South Carolina
Populated places established in 1745
Unincorporated communities in South Carolina
1745 establishments in the Thirteen Colonies